Philip Hunter may refer to:
Philip Hunter (educationist) (born 1940), British educationist
Philip Vassar Hunter (1883–1956), British electrical engineer
Phil Hunter, a fictional character in The Bill
Philip Hunter (RAF officer), RAF pilot during the Battle of Britain